The Philippines had three adaptations of the singing competition Pop Idol under three different titles and on three different networks: 

 Philippine Idol, which aired in 2006 on ABC 5 (now TV5)
 Pinoy Idol, which aired in 2008 on GMA 7
 Idol Philippines, produced by ABS-CBN Entertainment
 2019 Idol Philippines (season 1) 
 2022 Idol Philippines (season 2)

See also
 1DOL, a 2010 Filipino TV drama on ABS-CBN

Philippines
Television series by Fremantle (company)